Frisol was a Dutch professional cycling team that existed from 1973 to 1977. Its main sponsor was Dutch oil trader Frisol. Its most notable victory was Jan Raas's win of the 1977 Milan–San Remo.

References

External links

Cycling teams based in the Netherlands
Defunct cycling teams based in the Netherlands
1973 establishments in the Netherlands
1977 disestablishments in the Netherlands
Cycling teams established in 1973
Cycling teams disestablished in 1977